Chorotypinae is a subfamily of grasshoppers in the family Chorotypidae. There are currently more than 30 described species in Chorotypinae, found in Africa and Asia

Genera
These genera belong to the subfamily Chorotypinae:
tribe Chorotypini Stål, 1873
 Burrinia Bolívar, 1930
 Chorotypus Serville, 1838
 Hemierianthus Saussure, 1903
 Orchetypus Brunner von Wattenwyl, 1898
 Phyllochoreia Westwood, 1839
 Pseudorchetypus Descamps, 1974
 Scirtotypus Brunner von Wattenwyl, 1898
incertae sedis
 Xiphicera Lamarck, 1817 - monotypic X. gallinacea (Fabricius, 1793)

References

External links

Caelifera
Orthoptera subfamilies